Mario Albertelli was an Italian cinematographer.

Selected filmography

 Black Shirt (1933)
 Tomb of the Angels (1937)
 13 Men and a Gun (1938)
 Ettore Fieramosca (1938)
 The Last Enemy (1938)
 In the Country Fell a Star (1939)
 Two Million for a Smile (1939)
 Who Are You? (1939)
 Maddalena, Zero for Conduct (1940)
 Teresa Venerdì (1941)
 Idyll in Budapest (1941)
 Marco Visconti (1941)
 Rossini (1942)
 Fedora (1942)
 The Devil's Gondola (1946)
 Buried Alive (1949)
 Vertigine d'amore (1949)
 How I Discovered America (1949)
 47 morto che parla (1950)
The Elusive Twelve (1950)
 Figaro Here, Figaro There (1950)
 Toto Looks for a Wife (1950)
 Bluebeard's Six Wives (1950)
 Arrivano i nostri (1951)
 The Ungrateful Heart (1951)
 The Reluctant Magician (1951)
 The Black Captain (1951)
 My Heart Sings (1951)
 Il microfono è vostro (1951)
 At Sword's Edge (1952)
 The Secret of Three Points (1952)
 Red Love (1952)
 Five Paupers in an Automobile (1952)
 Sardinian Vendetta (1952)
 Deceit (1952)
 Lulu (1953)
 I Chose Love (1953)
 Frine, Courtesan of Orient (1953)
 Nero and the Burning of Rome (1953)
 Papà Pacifico (1954)
 Tragic Ballad (1954)
 Napoli piange e ride (1954)
 Peppino e la vecchia signora (1954)
 New Moon (1955)
 Toto, Peppino and the Outlaws (1956)
 Toto, Peppino, and the Hussy (1956)

References

Bibliography 
 Mitchell, Charles P. The Great Composers Portrayed on Film, 1913 through 2002. McFarland, 2004.

External links 
 

1904 births
Year of death unknown
Italian cinematographers
Film people from Rome